Billy J. Garrett, Jr. (born October 5, 1956) is an American politician. He is a member of the South Carolina Senate from the 10th District, serving since 2020. He is a member of the Republican party.

Electoral history

References

Living people
1956 births
People from Williamston, South Carolina
Republican Party South Carolina state senators
21st-century American politicians
Lander University alumni
University of South Carolina School of Law alumni